Cost engineering is "the engineering practice devoted to the management of project cost, involving such activities as estimating, cost control, cost forecasting, investment appraisal and risk analysis". "Cost Engineers budget, plan and monitor investment projects. They seek the optimum balance between cost, quality and time requirements." 

Skills and knowledge of cost engineers are similar to those of quantity surveyors.  In many industries, cost engineering is synonymous with project controls.  As the title "engineer" has legal requirements in many jurisdictions (i.e. Texas, Canada), the cost engineering discipline is often renamed to project controls. 

A cost engineer is "an engineer whose judgment and experience are utilized in the application of scientific principles and techniques to problems of estimation; cost control; business planning and management science; profitability analysis; project management; and planning and scheduling".

Overview 
One key objective of cost engineering is to arrive at accurate cost estimates and schedules, and to avoid cost overruns and schedule slips. Cost engineering goes beyond preparing cost estimates and schedules by helping manage resources and supporting assessment and decision-making. "The discipline of ‘cost engineering’ can be considered to encompass a wide range of cost-related aspects of engineering and programme management, but in particular cost estimating, cost analysis/cost assessment, design-to-cost, schedule analysis/planning and risk assessment." The broad array of cost engineering topics represent the intersection of the fields of project management, business management, and engineering. Most people have a limited view of what engineering encompasses. The most obvious perception is that engineering addresses technical issues, such as the physical design of a structure or system. However, beyond the physical manifestation of a design of a structure or system (for example, a building), there are other dimensions to consider such as the money, time, and other resources that were invested in the creation of the building. Cost engineers refer to these investments collectively as "costs". 

Cost engineering, then, can be considered an adjunct of traditional engineering. It recognizes and focuses on the relationships between the physical and cost dimensions of whatever is being "engineered". Cost engineering is most often taught at universities as part of construction engineering, engineering management, civil engineering,  and related curricula because it is most often practiced on engineering and construction capital projects. Engineering economics is a core skill and knowledge area of cost engineering.

Associations, considered non-profit organizations--one example, is AACE International "is dedicated to the tenets of furthering the concepts of Total Cost Management and Cost Engineering. Total Cost Management is the effective application of professional and technical expertise to plan and control resources, costs, profitability and risk. Simply stated, it is a systematic approach to managing cost throughout the life cycle of any enterprise, program, facility, project, product or service. This is accomplished through the application of cost engineering and cost management principles, proven methodologies and the latest technology in support of the management process. ... Total Cost Management is that area of engineering practice where engineering judgment and experience are utilized in the application of scientific principles and techniques to problems of business and program planning; cost estimating; economic and financial analysis; cost engineering; program and project management; planning and scheduling; and cost and schedule performance measurement and change control. In summary, the list of practice areas ... are collectively called cost engineering; while the “process” through which these practices are applied is called total cost management or TCM.

History 
Cost engineering is a field of engineering practice that began in the 1950s (AACE International was founded in 1956). The skills and knowledge areas of cost engineers are similar to those of quantity surveyors. AACE International is one of many international engineering organizations representing practitioners in these fields. The International Cost Engineering Congress (ICEC) was founded in 1976 as a Worldwide Confederation of Cost Engineering, Quantity Surveying and Project Management Societies.

In 2006, AACE published the Total Cost Management (TCM) Framework, which outlines an integrated process for applying the skills and knowledge of cost engineering (see References). This has also been called the world's first process for portfolio, program and project management.

Professional titles or positions in cost engineering
"Cost engineering practitioners tend to be: a) specialized in function (e.g., cost estimating, planning and scheduling, etc.); b) focused on either the asset management or project control side of the TCM process; and c) focused on a particular industry (e.g., engineering and construction, manufacturing, information technology, etc) or asset type (e.g., chemical process, buildings, software, etc.)... They may work for the business that owns and operates the asset (emphasis on economics and analysis), or they may work for the contractor that executes the projects (emphasis on planning and control)."

Some titles or positions in the Cost Engineering practice include:

 Claims and Changes Specialist
 Construction Estimator
 Construction Manager
 Contract Management Specialist
 Cost Analyst
 Cost Engineer
 Cost Estimator (or Estimator)
 Planner/Scheduler (or Scheduling Engineer)
 Pre-Construction Manager
 Project Controls Engineer
 Project Controls Manager
 Project Controls
 Project Controller
 Project Manager
 Quantity Surveyor

See also

 AACE International
 Building estimator
 Construction Management
 Cost estimate
 Construction Estimating Software
 Cost overrun
 Cost-plus contract
 International Cost Engineering Council
 Muntzing
 Optimism bias
 Pre-construction services
 Project management
 Quantity surveyor
 Reference class forecasting
 Total delivery cost
 Value engineering

References

Further reading 
 Amos, Scott (editor), "Skills and Knowledge of Cost Engineering," Fifth Edition, AACE International, Morgantown, West Virginia, 2004.
 Humphreys, Kenneth K (editor), "Jelen's Cost and Optimization Engineering" 3rd Edition, McGraw-Hill, 1991.
 Hollmann, John K. (editor), "Total Cost Management Framework", AACE International, Morgantown WV, 2006.
 Dale Shermon, Systems Cost Engineering, Gower publishing, 2009,

External links
 Quantity Surveyor|Cost Estimator (Quantity Surveying and Cost Engineering Web Portal)
 AACE International (Association for the Advancement of Cost Engineering)
 International Cost Engineering Council (ICEC)
 Society for Cost Analysts and Forecasting (SCAF)
 Association of Cost Engineers (ACostE)
 Dutch Association of Cost Engineers (DACE)
 Cost Engineering at Cranfield University, UK
 Cost Engineering at Cost Engineering Academy, NL
 
 Engineering disciplines